Johnny Frigo's DNA Exposed! is an album by jazz violinist Johnny Frigo that was released by Arbors.

Track listing 
I Concentrate on You (4:53)     
Poor Butterfly (4:51)     
Cheek to Cheek (4:37)     
What Is There to Say? (3:33)     
Nobody Else But Me (6:01)     
Try a Little Tenderness/Sweet Lovely (5:48)     
Hair on the G-String (4:32)     
I Love You (2:52)     
Too Late Now/Street of Dreams (6:22)     
She Loves Me (2:44)     
Crystal Silence (6:51)     
Tanga (4:48)     
What'll I Do? (2:28)

Personnel
 Johnny Frigo – violin
 Bill Charlap – piano
 Bucky Pizzarelli – guitar
 Frank Vignola – guitar
 Nicki Parrott – double bass
 Joe Ascione – drums

References

2002 albums
Johnny Frigo albums
Arbors Records albums
Swing albums